Ebara-ji (家原寺) is a Buddhist temple in Nishi-ku, Sakai, Osaka Prefecture, Japan. It is affiliated with Kōyasan Shingon-shū. The central icon is the Bodhisattva, Monju (Mañjuśrī).

History 
According to temple legend the temple was founded in 704. It was the birthplace of the Buddhist monk Gyōki.

Pilgrimages 
 Thirteen Buddhist Sites of Osaka #3
 18 Ancient Pagodas #1
 Saigoku Yakushi 49 Sacred Sites #15

See also 
Thirteen Buddhist Sites of Osaka

External links 

  Official website
  Sakai City Shrines and Temples

Buddhist temples in Osaka Prefecture
Kōyasan Shingon temples
Emperor Shōmu
Gyōki